Madison Sarah "Mady" Solow (born 30 March 1992) is a Polish footballer who plays as a midfielder for Spanish Segunda División Pro club DUX Logroño. Born in Canada, she represented the Poland women's national team.

Early life
Solow was born and raised in Toronto, Ontario.

College career
Solow has attended the University of Florida and the University of California, Irvine in the United States.

Club career
Solow has played for Thróttur Reykjavík in Iceland and for Chievo Verona and Hellas Verona in Italy.

International career
Solow capped for Poland at senior level during the UEFA Women's Euro 2017 qualifying.

References

External links

1992 births
Living people
Citizens of Poland through descent
Polish women's footballers
Women's association football midfielders
Florida Gators women's soccer players
UC Irvine Anteaters women's soccer players
FC Basel Frauen players
Úrvalsdeild kvenna (football) players
Serie A (women's football) players
Swiss Women's Super League players
Poland women's international footballers
Polish expatriate footballers
Polish expatriate sportspeople in the United States
Expatriate women's soccer players in the United States
Polish expatriate sportspeople in Iceland
Expatriate women's footballers in Iceland
Polish expatriate sportspeople in Italy
Expatriate women's footballers in Italy
Polish expatriate sportspeople in Switzerland
Expatriate women's footballers in Switzerland
Polish expatriate sportspeople in Spain
Expatriate women's footballers in Spain
Soccer players from Toronto
Canadian women's soccer players
Canadian expatriate women's soccer players
Canadian expatriate sportspeople in the United States
Canadian expatriate sportspeople in Iceland
Canadian expatriate sportspeople in Italy
Canadian expatriate sportspeople in Switzerland
Canadian expatriate sportspeople in Spain
Canadian people of Polish descent
Polish people of Canadian descent
Hellas Verona Women players